Private Izzy Murphy is a 1926 American silent comedy-drama film with Vitaphone sound effects, starring George Jessel, and Patsy Ruth Miller. The film was released by Warner Bros. It is unknown if a copy survives meaning it could be a lost film. The film was followed up by Sailor Izzy Murphy.

Plot
Isadore Goldberg, an enterprising Russian Jew, comes to the United States and establishes himself in the delicatessen business so that he can one day send for his parents. Forced to vacate his store, Izzy relocates in an Irish neighborhood; there, after he changes his surname to "Murphy," his business prospers. While waiting for a subway train, Izzy recovers a girl's handkerchief; later, he meets her in his store and learns that she is Eileen Cohannigan, from whose father he buys foodstuffs. After the arrival of Izzy's parents, he embarks for France with an all-Irish regiment and inspires his comrades to deeds of valor. He is welcomed home by Cohannigan, but when Cohannigan learns that he is Jewish, he denounces his daughter for loving him. With the aid of his service buddies, however, Izzy and Eileen head for City Hall to be married.

Cast
George Jessel as Isadore 'Izzy' Goldberg, posing as I. Patrick Murphy
Patsy Ruth Miller as Eileen Cohannigan
Vera Gordon as Sara Goldberg
Nat Carr as The Shadchen, Moe Ginsberg
 William H. Strauss as Jacob Goldberg 
Spec O'Donnell as The Monohan Kid
Gustav von Seyffertitz as Cohannigan
Douglas Gerrard as Robert O'Malley
Tom Murray as The Attorney
Rusty Tolbert

See also
List of early Warner Bros. sound and talking features

Box office
According to Warner Bros records the film earned $304,000 domestically and $69,000 foreign.

Review

—The New York Times

References

External links

1926 films
1920s English-language films
American silent feature films
Warner Bros. films
1926 comedy-drama films
Military humor in film
Western Front (World War I) films
American black-and-white films
Films directed by Lloyd Bacon
1920s American films
Silent American comedy-drama films